The 5-centimeter or 5 GHz band is a portion of the SHF (microwave) radio spectrum internationally allocated to amateur radio and amateur satellite use on a secondary basis.  In ITU regions 1 and 3, the amateur radio band is between 5,650 MHz and 5,850 MHz.  In ITU region 2, the amateur radio band is between 5,650 MHz and 5,925 MHz.  The amateur satellite service is allocated 5,830 to 5,850 MHz, for down-links only on a secondary basis, and it is also allocated 5,650 to 5,670 MHz, for up-links only on a non-interference basis to other users (ITU footnote 5.282).  Amateur stations must accept harmful interference from ISM users operating in the band.  The band is within the IEEE C Band spectrum.

The 5 cm band in the United States overlaps part of the U-NII band and all of 5 GHz ISM band.  Both overlapping bands are available for license-free applications such as WiFi or Part 15 devices.

5 cm is one of the primary bands for high-speed multimedia radio, as most U-NII and Part 15 equipment may be re-tuned to amateur frequencies.

List of notable frequencies 

5,668.2 MHz Region 1 Calling Frequency 1
5,760.1 MHz Region 2 Calling Frequency
5,760.2 MHz Region 1 Calling Frequency 2
5,800 MHz ISM band center frequency

See also 
Amateur radio frequency allocations

References 

Amateur radio bands
United States communications regulation
Centimetric bands